Mizhrichchia or Mezhdurechye (literally, between the rivers) is a village in the Sudak Municipality of the Crimea, a territory recognized by a majority of countries as part of Ukraine and annexed by Russia as the Republic of Crimea.

Its population was 510 in the 2001 Ukrainian census. Current population:

History
Previously, the settlement was known as the Ai-Serez village. Following the forced deportation of the Crimean Tatars in 1944, the Presidium of the Supreme Soviet of the Russian SFSR published a decree on May 18, 1948 renaming the settlement along with many others throughout Crimea from their native Crimean Tatar names to their current variants.

In 1886, the village of Ai-Serez was located in the Taraktash Volost of the Feodosia Povit of the Taurida Governorate. At that time, the settlement had a population of 655 inhabitants; it had two mosques located in its settlement. In the 1897 Russian Empire census, the population increased to 1,464 inhabitants, 1,458 of which belonged to the Muslim faith.

People from Mizhrichchia
 Mustafa Dzhemilev, former Chairman of the Mejlis of the Crimean Tatar People, People's Deputy of Ukraine since 1998
 Abdurakhman Chubarov, father of Refat Chubarov, current Chairman of the Mejlis of the Crimean Tatar People

References

External links
 


Villages in Crimea
Sudak Municipality
Feodosiysky Uyezd